Vanier College (French: Collège Vanier) is an English-language public college located in the Saint-Laurent borough of Montreal, Quebec, Canada. It was founded in 1970 as the second English-language public college of Quebec's public college system, after Dawson College. Vanier is located just north of CEGEP Saint-Laurent, a French-language public college. Today, the student population numbers over 6,700 full-time Diploma students with an additional 2,000 students attending through the Continuing Education Department (credit and non-credit courses and programs). Vanier College is one of 48 public Cegeps in the province.

Programs
Vanier College offers over twenty-five programs of study in both two-year pre-university and three-year technical fields. With a student population averaging eight thousand, Vanier College is the second-largest English-language college in Québec. The college offers two types of programs: a full-time pre-university program and technical career programs leading to a Diploma of College Studies (DCS). The pre-university programs, which take two years to complete, cover the subject matters which roughly correspond to the additional year of high school given elsewhere in Canada in preparation for a chosen field in university. Students graduating from a college program are prepared more adequately for university studies.

Partnerships
The College of General and Professional Education is affiliated with the Association of Canadian Community Colleges (ACCC) and Canadian Colleges Athletic Association (CCAA).

Athletics
The college participates as the Vanier Cheetahs in the Canadian Colleges Athletic Association and the Quebec Student Sport Federation, and is known for its men's and women's basketball, football (soccer) and rugby union teams, men's Canadian football teams, and women's flag football teams.

History 

Vanier College was named in honour of Georges Vanier, Canada's second native-born Governor General.

Before Vanier (1817-1970) 
Vanier College today consists of 10 different buildings on a single campus. Each of its buildings was built at a different point in the college's history, and is identified by a letter of the alphabet.

The land that the campus is located on today was first used for the Village de Saint-Laurent chapel, opened in 1817. Thirty years later, a convent, known as the Couvent Notre-Dame-des-Anges, was built nearby by the Sisters of Holy Cross (fr: Sœurs de Sainte-Croix). The original Convent building was later expanded into the building known as the "C building" today. 

In 1897, the sisters opened the first college on the campus land, on the location of today's "E building". That building was expanded in 1848 and 1857 to become today's "E building". In 1873, a chapel was built that connected the convent and college buildings. That chapel was a forerunner of today's "F building". The "B building" was a further expansion of the convent built on the north side of the "C building" in 1904. It was unclear exactly when the "D building" was built, but it appears to have been at around this same time. The "D building" connected to the rear (east side) of the original "F building" chapel.

Originally, both the "D" and "E" buildings had elaborate balconies on every floor, which were removed in the 1970s. This is why several windows on both buildings today are taller than the rest of the windows in the building - these windows were doors to the balconies in the original building design.

In 1911, the original Village de Saint-Laurent chapel was demolished, to be replaced by a new school for young girls, Académie Saint-Alfred. The cupola at the top of the new building was designed to reflect a similar cupola on the original chapel building. This new building eventually became Vanier's "H building".

In 1933, the Sisters opened the yet another college, Collège Basile-Moreau, within the existing convent buildings. This soon required further expansions to the campus. In the 1940s, the "A building" was built at the north end of the "B building".

In the 1950s, the original "F building" chapel was demolished and replaced with the building that stands as the "F building" today. In 1967, several institutions were merged and became public ones, when the Quebec system of CEGEPs was created.

Since becoming Vanier (1970-present) 

In 1970, the Quebec government purchased the entire property and it was re-opened as Vanier College, Quebec's second English language public college (after Dawson College that had opened the year previous). Enrollment in its first year was approximately 1,400 students.

Even though the library has three floors, it can only be entered via its first floor.
The oldest of the main building sections is the "E building".
It has been agreed upon that getting from any one room to another takes under ten minutes, within the boundaries of the campus.

Notable alumni 
 Robert Aaron, jazz musician
 Jabari Arthur, wide receiver for the CFL
 Tim Biakabutuka, former NFL player
 Randy Chevrier, former CFL and NFL player
 Russell Copeman, politician
 David De La Peralle, former CFL offensive lineman
 Farell Duclair, Canadian football player
 Otis Grant, one-time boxing world champion
 Yolande James, first black woman elected to the provincial legislature
 Patrick Kabongo, offensive lineman for the CFL Edmonton Eskimos
 Emilie Kahn, musician also known as Emilie & Ogden
 Elias Koteas, actor
 Paul Lambert, CFL player for Hamilton Tiger-Cats and Montreal Alouettes
 Robert Libman, politician
 John Moore, radio and television broadcaster who currently works on CFRB
 Thomas Mulcair, Leader of the Official Opposition in Canada, leader of the NDP, a lawyer, university professor, and politician
 Andy Nulman, co-founder of "Just for Laughs" comedy festival
 Karine Sergerie, Olympic silver medalist
 Mutsumi Takahashi, full-time co-anchor for CFCF News
 Frédérique Vézina, opera singer
 Andrew Walker, actor
 Patrick Watson, indie rock musician
 Steven Woloshen, pioneer of hand-made experimental films
 Steve Zatylny, Canadian football player
 Mitch Garber, business executive, philanthropist
 David Zilberman, teacher, coach, wrestling champion
 Mitch Joel, journalist, publicist
 Herbie Kuhn, public address announcer (Toronto Raptors)
 Mark Cohen, eye surgeon, founder of Lasik MD
 Juliette Powell, Miss Canada titleholder in 1989, television host, producer, author
 Ralph Gilles, automobile designer and executive
 Danny Desriveaux, former CFL player
 Alan DeSousa, politician
 Karim Mane, NBA Player
 Abraham Toro, MLB player

Notable staff 

Denis Sampson, Irish writer and literary critic
 Errol Sitahal, writer, director, filmmaker and actor, taught at Vanier College in the 1970s
 Dr. Joe, Joe Schwarcz, science popularizer, former chemistry teacher
 Ariel Fenster, science popularizer, former chemistry teacher
 Gordon Edwards, mathematics, President and Co-Founder of the Canadian Coalition for Nuclear Responsibility
 Martine Dugrenier, Former world champion in women's wrestling
 Anjali Khandwala, Gujarati writer, taught at Vanier College in 1970s

See also 
 List of colleges in Quebec
 Higher education in Quebec

Other English-language Colleges:
 Champlain
 Dawson College
 Heritage College
 John Abbott College
 Marianopolis College

References

External links 
 Vanier College
 

Quebec CEGEP
Universities and colleges in Montreal
Colleges in Quebec
English-language universities and colleges in Quebec
International Baccalaureate schools in Quebec
Saint-Laurent, Quebec
Educational institutions established in 1970
1970 establishments in Quebec